The South Australian Railways P class was a class of 2-4-0T steam locomotives operated by the South Australian Railways.

History
The first six were built by Beyer, Peacock & Co for the South Australian Railways (SAR) in 1884.

Their design was based on an earlier design built by Beyer Peacock for the Isle of Wight Railway. The New South Wales Government Railways F351 class locomotive was also based on this design. The class was successful and a further 14 locomotives were built by James Martin & Co.

Initially the locomotives served hauling suburban trains in Adelaide until replaced by the F class in the early 1900s. In 1899, the SAR took over operations on the Glenelg Railway Company's two lines. The P and K classes replaced the small tank engines on this line, running until 1929 when the lines were closed. The P class served out the remainder of its career on shunting duties and hauling freight trains between Adelaide and Port Adelaide.

P117 has been preserved by the National Railway Museum, Port Adelaide.

References

External links

Beyer, Peacock locomotives
Railway locomotives introduced in 1884
P
2-4-0T locomotives
Broad gauge locomotives in Australia